John Chenoweth may refer to:
 John Chenoweth (Colorado politician)
 John C. Chenoweth, Minnesota politician